Widnes Vikings are an English rugby league club based in Widnes, Lancashire.

The following is a list former and current Widnes Vikings players across various metrics who have played for the club since the formation of the Northern Union in 1895. Players are listed in alphabetical order.

Players with 100+ caps

Players earning international caps whilst at Widnes

Represented Great Britain

Michael "Mick" Adams
John Basnett
Keith Bentley
Michael "Mick" Burke
Frank Collier
Andy Currier
Jonathan Davies
John Devereux
Ray Dutton
David Eckersley
Keith Elwell
Richard Eyres
John Fieldhouse
Ian Hare
Alec Higgins
Fred Higgins
Leslie "Les" Holliday
Eric Hughes
David Hulme
Paul Hulme
Leslie "Les" Gorley
Arthur 'Chick' Johnson
George Kemel
Dennis O'Neill
Thomas "Tommy" McCue
Steve McCurrie
James "Jim" Measures
'Big' Jim Mills
Frank Myler
Anthony "Tony" Myler
George Nicholls
Martin Offiah
Michael "Mike" O'Neill
Harry Pinner
Nat Silcock Sr.
Glyn Shaw
Stuart Spruce
Alan Tait
Darren Wright
Stuart Wright

Represented England

Michael "Mick" Adams
Michael "Mick" Burke
Phil Cantillon
Ray Dutton
David Eckersley
Keith Elwell
Richard Eyres
John "Jackie" Fleming
Ray French
Leslie "Les" Gorley
Alec Higgins
Fred Higgins
Gareth Hock
Jimmy Hoey
Eric Hughes
David Hulme
Paul Hulme
Arthur 'Chick' Johnson
Frederick "Fred" Kelsall
John "Jack" Lally
Doug Laughton
Thomas "Tommy" McCue
Steve McCurrie
Hugh McDowell
Harry Millington
Daniel "Danny" Naughton
George Nicholls
Andy Platt
William Reid
Robert Roberts
Thomas "Tommy" Shannon
Nat Silcock Sr.
Stuart Spruce
Jimmy Walker
Darren Wright
Stuart Wright
Harry Young
Kevin Brown

Represented Ireland
Phil Cantillon
David Allen
Lee Doran
Kurt Haggerty
Anthony Mullally

Represented Scotland
John Duffy
Iain Morrison
Lee Paterson
Alan Tait

Represented Wales
Rhodri Lloyd
Lloyd White
Jonathan Davies
Richard Eyres
Adrian Hadley
John Devereux
'Big' Jim Mills
Glyn Shaw

Represented France
Adel Fellous

Represented Tonga
Lee Hansen

Hall of Fame
The Widnes Hall of Fame was instituted in 1991 with thirteen members. Any former Widnes player who was retired from playing was eligible. The thirteen players who make up the current Hall of Fame are:

Mick Adams
Mick Burke
Keith Elwell
Fred Higgins
Jimmy Hoey
Arthur 'Chick' Johnson
Vince Karalius
Doug Laughton
Tommy McCue
Harry Millington
'Big' Jim Mills
Frank Myler
Nat Silcock, Sr.
Kurt Sorensen
Martin Offiah

Other notable players

 Mal Aspey
 Reg Bowden
 Jim Boylan (Lancashire circa-1971)
 Phil Cantillon
 Eddie Cunningham
 Andy Currier
 Andy Gregory
 Joey Grima
 Vince Karalius
 Emosi Koloto
 Joe Lydon
 George Nicholls
 Kurt Sorensen
 Alan Tait

Super League era players
The following players represented the club when the Vikings were in the Super League from 2002 to 2005 and also from 2012 to 2018.

2002–2005

 Paul Alcock circa-2003
 Paul Atcheson circa-2002
 Paul Ballard circa-2005
 Richie Barnett Jnr circa-2005
 Adam Bibey circa-2004
 Deon Bird circa-2003
 Michael "Mike" Briggs circa-2002
 Blake Cannova circa-2002
 Phil Cantillon circa-2002
 Steve Carter circa-2002
 Mick Cassidy circa-2005
 Gary Connolly circa-2005
 Owen Craigie circa-2005
 Paul Crook circa-2005
 Jason Demetriou circa-2002
 Paul Devlin circa-2002
 Jamie Durbin circa-2005
 Barry Eaton circa-2002
 Andrew Emelio circa-2005
 Sala Fa'alogo circa-2004
 Anthony Farrell circa-2002
 Simon Finnigan circa-2003
 Daniel Frame circa-2002
 Tommy Gallagher circa-2004
 Christopher "Chris" Giles circa-2003
 Marvin Golden circa-2003
 Gareth Haggerty circa-2002
 Steve Hall circa-2004
 Andrew "Andy" Hay circa-2003
 Andrew "Andy" Hobson circa-2004
 Timothy "Tim" Holmes circa-2004
 Adam Hughes circa-2002
 Gary Hulse circa-2005
 Aled James circa-2003
 Bruce Johnson circa-2004
 Keiran Kerr circa-2005
 Dean Lawford circa-2003
 Karl Long circa-2002
 Misili Manu circa-2005
 Steve McCurrie circa-2002
 Ryan McDonald circa-2002
 Gary Middlehurst circa-2004
 Shane Millard circa-2003
 David Mills circa-2002
 Aaron Moule circa-2004
 Damian Munro circa-2002
 Justin Murphy circa-2004
 Stephen Myler circa-2003
 Stephen Nash circa-2005
 Terrence "Terry" O'Connor circa-2005
 Julian O'Neill circa-2003
 Julian O'Neill circa-2002
 Christopher "Chris" Percival circa-2002
 Willie Peters circa-2004
 Daniel "Dan" Potter circa-2002
 Robert Relf circa-2002
 Sean Richardson circa-2002
 John Robinson circa-2003
 Stephen Rowlands circa-2004
 Nicholas "Nicky" Royle circa-2004
 Ryan Sheridan circa-2003
 Mark Smith circa-2005
 Stuart Spruce circa-2002
 John Stankevitch circa-2005
 Troy Stone circa-2002
 Gray Viane circa-2005
 Brad Watts circa-2005
 Craig Weston circa-2002
 Matthew Whitaker circa-2004
 Jon Whittle circa-2005
 Philip "Phil" Wood circa-2004
 Darren Woods circa-2005
 Troy Wozniak circa-2004

2012–2018

 Patrick Ah Van 2012–2018
 Dave Allen 2012–2014
 Tom Armstrong 2017
 Olly Ashall-Bott 2016–Present
 Keanan Brand 2018–Present
 Shaun Briscoe 2012–2013
 Alex Brown 2012
 Kevin Brown 2013–2016
 Chris Bridge 2016–2017
 Sam Brooks 2016–2017
 Jack Buchanan 2017
 Greg Burke 2016–2018
 Kieran Butterworth 2013–2015
 Liam Carberry 2014–2015
 Hep Cahill 2012–Present
 Ed Chamberlain 2015–2018
 Ted Chapelhow 2015–Present
 Jay Chapelhow 2015–Present
 Jon Clarke 2012–2014
 Chris Clarkson 2015
 Thomas Coyle 2012
 Danny Craven 2012–Present
 Ben Cross 2012–2013
 Ben Davies 2012–2013
 Chris Dean 2012–Present
 Gil Dudson 2016–2018
 Owen Farnworth 2018–Present
 Simon Finnigan 2012
 Paddy Flynn 2012–2016
 Danny Galea 2014–2015
 Alex Gerrard 2012–2018
 Tom Gilmore 2012–Present
 Grant Gore 2012–2015
 Kurt Haggerty 2012
 Rhys Hanbury 2012–2018
 Aaron Heremaia 2015–2018
 Gareth Hock 2013
 Chris Houston 2016–2018
 Declan Hulme 2013–2015
 Ryan Ince 2015–Present
 Willie Isa 2012–2015
 Krisnan Inu 2018–2019
 Paul Johnson 2014–2015
 Jordan Johnstone 2017–Present
 Phil Joseph 2013–2015
 Ben Kavanagh 2012–2015
 John Kite 2012
 Adam Lawton 2013–2014
 Macgraff Leuluai 2012–Present
 Rhodri Lloyd 2014–
 Joe Lyons 2018–Present
 Manase Manuokafoa 2015–2017
 Stephen Marsh 2012–2018
 Paul Mcshane 2012
 Joe Mellor 2012–2018
 Scott Moore 2012
 Antony Mullally 2012
 Dan Norman 2018–Present
 Eamon O'Carroll 2012–2017
 Tom Olbison 2018
 Kato Ottio 2018
 Jack Owens 2012–2015
 Lloyd Roby 2018–Present
 Charly Runciman 2016–2018
 Setaimata Sa 2016
 Cameron Phelps 2012–2015
 Steve Pickersgill 2012–2014
 Corey Thompson 2016–2017
 Danny Tickle 2014–2016
 Anthony Watts 2012
 Brad Walker 2016–Present
 Liam Walsh 2018–Present
 Lloyd White 2012–2018
 Matt Whitley 2015–2017
 Sam Wilde 2018–Present
 Frank Winterstein 2012–2013

References

External links
Widnes RLFC Player Directory
Widnes Vikings - Players at Rugby League Project

 
Widnes Vikings